Jo Deok-haeng (born 1 November 1966) is a South Korean former cyclist. He competed in the team time trial at the 1988 Summer Olympics.

References

1966 births
Living people
South Korean male cyclists
Olympic cyclists of South Korea
Cyclists at the 1988 Summer Olympics
Place of birth missing (living people)
Asian Games medalists in cycling
Asian Games bronze medalists for South Korea
Cyclists at the 1990 Asian Games
Medalists at the 1990 Asian Games